Simone Pietro Ferrari (born 28 March 1994) is an Italian professional rugby union player who primarily plays prop for Benetton of the United Rugby Championship. He has also represented Italy at international level, having made his test debut against South Africa during the 2021 Autumn Nations Series. Ferrari has previously played for clubs such as Mogliano in the past.

Professional career 
In 2013 and 2014, Ferrari was named in the Italy Under 20 squad and from 2016 he was named in the Italy squad. 
On 18 August 2019, he was named in the final 31-man squad for the 2019 Rugby World Cup.

References

External links 

1994 births
Living people
People from Cernusco sul Naviglio
Italian rugby union players
Italy international rugby union players
Rugby union props
Mogliano Rugby players
Benetton Rugby players
Sportspeople from the Metropolitan City of Milan